David Charles Prowse  (1 July 1935 – 28 November 2020) was an English actor, bodybuilder, strongman and weightlifter. He portrayed Darth Vader (voiced by American actor James Earl Jones) in the original Star Wars trilogy and a manservant in Stanley Kubrick's 1971 film A Clockwork Orange. In 2015, he starred in two documentaries concerning his Darth Vader role, one entitled The Force's Mouth which included Prowse voicing Darth Vader's lines with studio effects applied for the first time, and the other titled I Am Your Father covering the subject of fallout between Prowse and Lucasfilm.

Prior to his role as Vader, Prowse had established himself as a super-hero figure in the United Kingdom as the Green Cross Man in the Green Cross Code road safety public information aimed at children and young people.

Early life
David Charles Prowse was born on 1 July 1935 in Bristol. He is the son of Gladys (née Burt) and Charles Prowse. He was brought up on the Southmead housing estate in Bristol, gaining a scholarship to Bristol Grammar School. Prowse was tall, standing , and developed an interest in bodybuilding. His early jobs included a bouncer at a dance hall, where he met his future wife, and a helper at Henleaze Swimming Pool. Following his successes from 1961 in the British heavyweight weightlifting championship, he left Bristol in 1963 to work for a London weightlifting company.

Career

Weightlifting and training
Prowse won the British heavyweight weightlifting championship in 1962 and the following two years. He represented England in the weightlifting event at the 1962 British Empire and Commonwealth Games in Perth, Western Australia. During his bodybuilding course, Prowse became friends with Arnold Schwarzenneger and Lou Ferrigno.

Prowse helped to train Christopher Reeve for the lead role in Superman (1978) after lobbying for the part himself. In a television interview, he related how his response to being told "we've found our Superman" was "Thank you very much." Only then was he told that Reeve had been chosen for the role and he was to only be a trainer. He trained Cary Elwes for his role as Westley in The Princess Bride (1987).

Prowse also became fitness consultant to Harrods, ripped up phone books under the stage name 'Jack the Ripper', and opened a series of gyms, including The Dave Prowse Fitness Centre in Southwark, London.

Acting

His first appearance is a brief cameo in a gym as a weightlifter in the 1968 TV show The Champions: the opening sequence of episode 2 "The Invisible Man".

In the United Kingdom, Prowse was well known as the Green Cross Man, a superhero invented to promote a road safety campaign for children in 1975. As a result of his association with the campaign, which ran between 1971 and 1990, he received the MBE in 2000.

He had a role as Frank Alexander's manservant, Julian, in the film A Clockwork Orange (1971), in which he was noticed by the future Star Wars director George Lucas. He played a circus strongman in Vampire Circus (1972), a Minotaur in the Doctor Who serial The Time Monster (also 1972), and an android named Coppin in The Tomorrow People in 1973. He appeared in an episode of Space: 1999, "The Beta Cloud" (1976), right before he was cast as Darth Vader. Around that time, he appeared as the Black Knight in the Terry Gilliam film Jabberwocky (1977) and was supposed to play Minoton in Sinbad and the Eye of the Tiger (1977), but the part went to Peter Mayhew instead, who later played Chewbacca in Star Wars.

Prowse claimed that he nearly got the role of Jaws in James Bond (which ultimately went to Richard Kiel) and was offered the part of Conan the Barbarian before Arnold Schwarzenegger.

Prowse had a small role as Hotblack Desiato's bodyguard in the 1981 BBC TV adaptation of The Hitchhiker's Guide to the Galaxy. He appeared in the first series of Ace of Wands on LWT and as a bodyguard in Callan (1974), a feature film version of the TV series. He played Charles, the duke's wrestler, in the BBC Television Shakespeare production of As You Like It in 1978.

Prowse played Frankenstein's monster in three films, Casino Royale and the Hammer horrors The Horror of Frankenstein and Frankenstein and the Monster from Hell. Prowse made two uncredited appearances on The Benny Hill Show. On Hill's first show for Thames Television in 1969, he played a briefs-clad muscleman in the "Ye Olde Wishing Well" quickie, and in 1984 "Scuttlevision" he showed off his muscles in a sketch set to the song "Stupid Cupid". The earlier routine was also featured in the 1974 film The Best of Benny Hill, in which he was credited.

Among his many non-speaking roles, Prowse played a major role in "Portrait of Brenda", the penultimate episode of The Saint broadcast in 1969.

In May 2010, he played Frank Bryan in The Kindness of Strangers, an independent British film produced by Queen Bee Films. The film screened at the 2010 Cannes Film Festival.

Star Wars
Prowse played the physical form of Darth Vader in the original Star Wars trilogy. Prowse spoke the dialogue during filming, but George Lucas wanted a "darker voice" than Prowse's relatively jovial West Country accent, and had James Earl Jones provide a more sinister, malevolent voice for the character. Prowse stated he was originally told he would be seen and heard at the end of Return of the Jedi when Vader's mask was removed. Instead, actor Sebastian Shaw was used. Upon Prowse's death, Lucas stated that:David brought a physicality to Darth Vader that was essential for the character. He made Vader leap off the page and on to the big screen, with an imposing stature and movement performance to match the intensity and undercurrent of Vader's presence. David was up for anything and contributed to the success of what would become a memorable, tragic figure.In the 2004 documentary Empire of Dreams, actress Carrie Fisher, who played Princess Leia in the original trilogy films, quipped that they nicknamed Prowse "Darth Farmer" (a jibe regarding his West Country accent). In the lightsaber fight scenes between Vader and Luke Skywalker (Mark Hamill), Prowse, who was not a very skilled swordsman and kept breaking the staffs used as the lightsabers, was replaced by the scene's fight choreographer, the stuntman and fencing coach Bob Anderson. Prowse felt sidelined by Anderson during the making of Return of the Jedi in particular, and said he was only able to persuade director Richard Marquand that he should be the one to throw the Emperor down the shaft after Marquand had tried and failed for a week to film the scene successfully without him.

Prowse reprised his role of Darth Vader for the video games Star Wars: The Interactive Video Board Game (1996) and Monopoly Star Wars (1997).

In 2002, Prowse became an honorary member and honorary leader of the 501st Legion, a fan group dedicated to Star Wars costuming.

Prowse continued to associate himself with his role in the Star Wars films and was involved in the convention circuit. Despite this, he was not included in some reunions of the original cast, such as those for the Empire of Dreams documentary and the 2005 Vanity Fair cover. While being interviewed by Kevin Moore of The Moore Show Prime Time, he admitted his dislike of the prequel trilogy and said the new films were "out of context" in terms of special effects in comparison to the original trilogy.

In July 2007, Prowse joined many others from the Star Wars films for the first ever Star Wars Celebration event held outside the United States. It was run by Lucasfilm Ltd. and the Cards Inc. Group, at the ExCeL Exhibition Centre in London. The occasion was to mark the 30th anniversary of Star Wars.

Prowse played a cameo role in the Star Wars fan films "Order of the Sith: Vengeance" and its sequel "Downfall" – Order of the Sith, alongside Jeremy Bulloch and Michael Sheard. These fan films were made in Britain in support of the charity Save the Children.

In 2008, he was one of the cast members featured on Justin Lee Collins's Bring Back...Star Wars. In the episode, Prowse commented that he had a dispute with Lucas after he allegedly leaked reports of Darth Vader's death to the press. Prowse had previously suggested that Darth Vader could be Luke Skywalker's father in a speech he gave to University of California, Berkeley, in 1978. However, this was shortly after the release of Star Wars and nearly two years before The Empire Strikes Back was released, and the script had not even been written at the time. Gary Kurtz, the producer of The Empire Strikes Back, said in the 2015 documentary I Am Your Father that Prowse's apparent plot spoiler was simply "a good guess."

Prowse stated his contract for Return of the Jedi included a share of profits on the film, and although it grossed $475 million on a $32 million budget, Prowse explained in an interview in 2009 that he never received residuals for his performance. Due to "Hollywood accounting", the actual profits are sent as "distribution fees" to the studio, leaving nothing to distribute to others.

In July 2010, Prowse was banned by Lucas from attending official Star Wars fan conventions. Lucas had given Prowse no reason, other than stating that Prowse "burnt too many bridges" between Lucasfilm and himself.

In 2011, Prowse wrote and released his autobiography Straight from the Force's Mouth.

A 2015 Spanish documentary by filmmaker Marcos Cabotá, entitled I Am Your Father, detailed Prowse's then life and his blackballing by Lucasfilm, which the documentary suggested was unjustified. The leaks featured in the documentary originated from a technician working on the films.

Partnership with Jayce Lewis

Prowse became friends with Welsh musician Jayce Lewis when the latter was a teenager, after they met at a science fiction convention. At the convention, Lewis recalled learning that Prowse's son, whom he later met after a performance, was also a drummer. On their shared musical interest, Prowse identified himself as "a music fan for years, going from big band jazz, trad jazz, modern and progressive."

The two became business partners with Prowse taking on a management and public relations role. He was also featured in the music video for "Shields" on the album Orderart. On 1 October 2015, Lewis created a mini-documentary entitled The Force's Mouth, which gave Prowse the opportunity to hear himself voicing Darth Vader's lines with studio effects applied for the first time.

Personal life
Prowse was married from 1963 to Norma Scammell and was the father of three children. He was a supporter of Bristol Rugby Club. He lived in Addiscombe, Croydon, in south London from 1963.

Prowse publicly declared his support for the United Kingdom Independence Party in the 2009 European Parliament election: "I've looked right and left and right again and the only party I can safely vote for is UKIP."

Health problems

Prowse suffered from arthritis for much of his life. This led to replacements of both hips, and to his ankle being fused, as well as several revisionary surgeries on his hip replacements. His arthritic symptoms first appeared when he was 13. Though they seemingly disappeared after he took up competitive weightlifting, they reappeared in 1990.

In 2000, Prowse's left arm became paralysed, followed by his right. He was diagnosed with septic arthritis caused by an infection which nearly killed him.

Prowse worked with multiple arthritis organisations in Britain and was vice-president of the Physically Handicapped and Able-bodied Association.

In March 2009, Prowse revealed that he was suffering from prostate cancer. From early 2009, he underwent radiation therapy at the Royal Marsden Hospital in South London.  In 2009, he was said to be in remission.

In November 2014, the Daily Mirror reported that he had dementia. Prowse denied this, but admitted that he had problems with his memory, which he put down to age.

Retirement
In October 2016, Prowse retired from all public appearances and events, due to ill health and the wishes of his family. His final onscreen appearance was filmed with the Welsh musician and his long-time friend Jayce Lewis in a sci-fi music video titled Shields.

Death

Prowse died at a hospital in London, England, on 28 November 2020, aged 85, after a short, unspecified illness.

Honours and awards
Prowse was appointed Member of the Order of the British Empire (MBE) for services to charity and road safety at the New Year Honours in 2000.

Filmography

References

External links

 
 
 
 David Prowse Biography

1935 births
2020 deaths
20th-century English male actors
21st-century English male actors
Commonwealth Games competitors for England

English bodybuilders
English male film actors
English male television actors
English male weightlifters
Male actors from Bristol
Masked actors
Members of the Order of the British Empire
People educated at Bristol Grammar School
Weightlifters at the 1962 British Empire and Commonwealth Games